Manomet, Inc. is a non-profit organization headquartered in Plymouth, Massachusetts, with an office in Brunswick, Maine.

Manomet scientists work with private industry, nonprofit and governmental partners across North and South America to create a more sustainable world. Manomet works in the areas of conservation, business sustainability and science education. Manomet has also been dedicated to learning more about birds and their habitats for 50 years.

History
Manomet was founded as a bird observatory named Manomet Bird Observatory in the summer of 1969 and was called Manomet Center for Conservation Sciences until 2015. 
Manomet is named for the coastal village in New England where its headquarters have been for more than 45 years. A Native American word, the name Manomet means portage path.

Manomet focuses its programs where they will have measurable impact and opportunity for scale: 
Climate Services — Integrating science and stakeholder networks to identify and implement nature–based solutions to climate change.
Landbird Conservation — Using long-term research and education to connect people to nature.
Shorebird Recovery — Engaging a diverse coalition of people and organizations across the Americas to develop and implement science-based solutions to conserve imperiled shorebirds.
Sustainable Economies — Advising partners on practices to enhance economic viability and human well-being while measurably reducing their environmental footprint

Recent studies
In June 2010, Manomet published the Biomass Sustainability and Carbon Policy Study. The study, which was commissioned by the Massachusetts Department of Energy Resources, investigated questions about generating electricity from biomass fuel, including the net effect of biomass energy on atmospheric carbon balance. The study concluded that greenhouse gas emissions from burning wood are initially higher than from fossil fuels, but the carbon sequestered by regrowing forests can yield lower greenhouse gas levels over time.

Manomet is also known for its long-term shorebird research in the Arctic.  In September 2010, the U.S. Fish and Wildlife Service selected Manomet to lead a $3 million, seven-month study to assess the impact on shorebirds from the massive Deepwater Horizon oil spill.

References

External links 
 
 Manomet's Grocery Stewardship Certification program
 Manomet's Root360 program 
 Western Hemisphere Shorebird Reserve Network

Ornithological organizations
Biological research institutes in the United States
Plymouth, Massachusetts
Research institutes in Massachusetts
Non-profit organizations based in Massachusetts
Environmental organizations based in Massachusetts